In telecommunications, RS-366, later known as EIA-366, defines a standard for serial communications between computers and an auto dialer, which is used to dial telephones. It was intended to be used to automate the operation of modems. The standard uses the same DB25 connectors and electrical signalling standards of the well-known RS-232 standard, which RS-366 was designed to support. The CCITT had a matching standard, V.25.

The earliest modems were used in the SAGE system that automated the collection of radar data, digitized it, and sent it over modems on leased lines to the SAGE computers. Modems were soon being used in business roles, notably in the SABRE that was patterned on the SAGE system. In these roles, the connections were always to the same remote machine, so there was no need to dial the phone, only connect and disconnect.

There were some business cases for automated dialling, but these tended to be mission specific. One common example was for a bank's central computer to call out to branches to retrieve transactions, thus centralizing the phone costs at the computer site rather than each branch. As these were highly customized applications, this lent itself to the development of a variety of incompatible systems. RS-366 was an effort to standardize the communications with these dialler systems.

RS-366, unlike RS-232, was a partially parallel communication system. Although most of the standard used RS-232 serial-like signalling, the digits of the phone number were sent as a 4-bit binary number in parallel on pins 14 through 17, with 14 being the least significant digit. So to send the digit 9, pins 14 (1) and 17 (8) would be put to the "mark" state, whereas the digit 6 would mark pins 15 and 16.

With each digit, the host system data terminal equipment (DTE, typically a computer) would raise pin 2 to indicate the digit was ready for the dialler to read. When the dialler completed the read, it would raise pin 5 to indicate it was ready for another. The "digit" 10 represented a wait-for-dialtone, while 11 indicated the end of the number. Once the entire dialling string had been read to the dialler, the DTE would start dialling by raising pin 4.

While the RS-366 standard process was progressing, the Hayes Smartmodem was introduced. This combined the modem and autodialler in a single box and communicated with both using a single RS-232 cable. This eliminated the cost and complexity of needing two ports and devices. The need for RS-366 disappeared, but the standards process continued for a time and at least some products were introduced based on it. The standard was obsolete by the time the Telecommunications Industry Association took over the EIA efforts, and it was never referred to as TIA-366.

Pinouts

References
 
 

Telecommunications standards